European Tour 1995 is the third EP released by the American anarcho street punk band Defiance, released on Consensus Reality Records in 1995.

Track listing 
A side
No Future No Hope - 4:47

B side
Waste of Time - 3:40
Back on the Piss Again - 2:34

Defiance (punk band) albums
1995 EPs